Petrus Adrianus Antonius ("Piet") Ruimers (21 October 1884 – 6 April 1945) was a Dutch track and field athlete who competed in the 1908 Summer Olympics.

He was born in Rotterdam and died in Texel during the Georgian Uprising of Texel. He and thirteen other civilians were chosen randomly and executed by German forces as reprisal for the uprising.

In 1908 he was eliminated in the first round of the 3500 metre walk competition as well as of the 10 mile walk event.

References

External links
list of Dutch athletes

1884 births
1945 deaths
Dutch male racewalkers
Olympic athletes of the Netherlands
Athletes (track and field) at the 1908 Summer Olympics
Athletes from Rotterdam
Dutch civilians killed in World War II
Dutch people executed by Nazi Germany
People executed by Nazi Germany by firing squad